The 1960 Duke Blue Devils football team represented Duke University during the 1960 NCAA University Division football season. Led by eighth-year head coach William D. Murray, the  Blue Devils were Atlantic Coast Conference champions, and won the Cotton Bowl by a point over favored Arkansas.

It was Duke's sixth and most recent major bowl appearance, and its only trip to the Cotton Bowl. The program's next bowl was nearly three decades away, in 1989, and the next bowl win came in 2015.

Schedule

References

Duke
Duke Blue Devils football seasons
Atlantic Coast Conference football champion seasons
Cotton Bowl Classic champion seasons
Duke Blue Devils football